Charles Whiteley (born 1885) was an English professional footballer who played as a winger.

References

1885 births
Year of death unknown
Footballers from Burnley
English footballers
Association football wingers
Burnley F.C. players
English Football League players
People from Burnley